Theclinesthes albocincta, the bitterbush blue or bitter-bush blue, is a species of butterfly native to most of Australia.

The larvae feed on Adriana hookeri and Adriana klotzschii.

References

Butterflies described in 1903
Polyommatini
Butterflies of Australia